Zvonimir Šeparović (14 September 1928 – 30 January 2022) was a Croatian jurist and politician.

Biography
Šeparović was a professor of Criminal Law at the University of Zagreb and rector of the University from 1989 to 1991. He was also known as the pioneer of victimology and a vocal opponent of death penalty.

Although he lacked any formal party or political affiliation, in 1991 he became foreign minister in the "National Government" of Franjo Gregurić. In 1992 he became the Permanent Representative of Croatia to the United Nations. He remained active in public life and did at one point become both a member of the Croatian Democratic Union (HDZ) as well as a member of the party's Central Committee.

In 2000, he entered the presidential race as an independent candidate, opposed to the official HDZ candidate Mate Granić. He finished last and, immediately after being informed about projected results, urged his supporters to vote for Dražen Budiša in the second round.

Personal life and death
Šeparović was married to Branka, a Croatian Radiotelevision reporter. He died on 30 January 2022, at the age of 93.

References

External links
Biography at the University of Zagreb website 

1928 births
2022 deaths
People from Blato, Korčula
Croatian Democratic Union politicians
Croatian diplomats
Faculty of Law, University of Zagreb alumni
University of Ljubljana alumni
Academic staff of the University of Zagreb
Rectors of the University of Zagreb
Members of the European Academy of Sciences and Arts
Permanent Representatives of Croatia to the United Nations
Foreign ministers of Croatia
Justice ministers of Croatia
Candidates for President of Croatia